This is a selectively annotated list of the most prominent or important members of the Socialist Party of America (1901–1972).

Summary list

Key: 
* Went on to join the Communist Party, Communist Labor Party of America or Workers Party of America
ISS A founder or key member of the Intercollegiate Socialist Society, 1905, later League for Industrial Democracy
IWW A founder of the Industrial Workers of the World, 1905.
SDL Left to found the Social Democratic League of America, 1917.
SDF Left to found the Social Democratic Federation, 1936.
IPN Left to found the Independent Party of Norwalk, 1951
SDUSA Continued into Social Democrats, USA, 1973
SPUSA Went on to join the Socialist Party USA, 1973
DSOC Went on to join the Democratic Socialist Organizing Committee, 1973, later Democratic Socialists of America

Martin Abern *
Devere Allen
Elmer Allison *
Harry Ault
J. Mahlon Barnes
David P. Berenberg
Victor L. Berger
Barney Berlyn
Allan L. Benson
Ella Reeve Bloor *
Nikolai Bukharin
Roy E. Burt
Frank Bohn IWW
Earl Browder*
Jack Carney *
James P. Cannon *
John C. Chase
Travers Clement
Joseph Coldwell
James Connolly
Eugene V. Debs IWW
Nicholas Dozenberg *
David Dubinsky
Max Eastman *
J. Louis Engdahl
Elizabeth Gurley Flynn *
William Z. Foster *
Louis Fraina *
Joseph Freeman *
Irving Freese IPN
Samuel Friedman SPUSA
Julius Gerber
Adolph Germer
Arturo Giovannitti
Benjamin Gitlow *
Carl Haessler *
Emanuel Haldeman-Julius SDL
Job Harriman
Michael Harrington DSOC
Hubert Harrison
Max S. Hayes
Bill Haywood IWW
Emil Herman
George D. Herron
Morris Hillquit ISS
Daniel Hoan
Darlington Hoopes SPUSA
Jessie Wallace Hughan ISS
Haim Kantorovitch
David Karsner
Helen Keller
Charles H. Kerr
George R. Kirkpatrick
Alexandra Kollontai
Antoinette Konikow *
Frederick Krafft
Maynard C. Krueger
William F. Kruse *
Leo Krzycki
Harry W. Laidler ISS
Algernon Lee ISS, SDF
Lena Morrow Lewis SDF
Walter Lippman
Jack London ISS
George Lunn
Theresa S. Malkiel
Mary Marcy
James H. Maurer  SDF
Jasper McLevy SDF
David McReynolds SPUSA
Walter Thomas Mills
Tom Mooney
Thomas J. Morgan
Gustavus Myers
Scott Nearing
Reinhold Niebuhr
Santeri Nuorteva
Kate Richards O'Hare
James Oneal SDF
Mary White Ovington
Joseph Arthur Padway
Jacob Panken
Patrick L. Quinlan
A. Philip Randolph SDF, SDUSA
John Reed *
Victor Reuther DSOC
Walter Reuther
Charles Edward Russell
Bayard Rustin SDUSA
Carl Sandburg
Margaret Sanger
Roland D. Sawyer
Clarence Senior
Max Shachtman
Abraham Shiplacoff
Upton Sinclair ISS
John W. Slayton
John Spargo SDL
Seymour Stedman
Charles P. Steinmetz
A.M. Stirton
J.G. Phelps Stokes ISS, SDL
Rose Pastor Stokes *
Maurice Sugar
Norman Thomas
Henry M. Tichenor
Hermon F. Titus
Gus Tyler
Ernest Untermann
Charles H. Vail
Baruch Charney Vladeck
Alfred Wagenknecht *
Louis Waldman SDF
Julius Wayland
George W. Woodbey
John M. Work
Frank P. Zeidler SPUSA

Annotated list

Key: 
* Went on to join the Communist Party, Communist Labor Party of America or Workers Party of America
ISS A founder or key member of the Intercollegiate Socialist Society, 1905, later League for Industrial Democracy
IWW A founder of the Industrial Workers of the World, 1905.
SDL Left to found the Social Democratic League of America, 1917.
SDF Left to found the Social Democratic Federation, 1936.
SDUSA Continued into Social Democrats, USA, 1973
SPUSA Went on to join the Socialist Party USA, 1973
DSOC Went on to join the Democratic Socialist Organizing Committee, 1973, later Democratic Socialists of America

Martin Abern *
Devere Allen
Elmer Allison *
E.B. "Harry" Ault
J. Mahlon Barnes
David P. Berenberg
Victor L. Berger, Congressman from Milwaukee
Barney Berlyn
Allan L. Benson, 1916 candidate for Vice-President
Ella Reeve Bloor *
Roy E. Burt
Frank Bohn IWW
Earl Browder *, Communist Party leader and presidential candidate
James P. Cannon *, leader of the Communist Party and Socialist Workers Party
Jack Carney
Travers Clement
Joseph Coldwell
James Connolly, Irish labor and nationalist leader
Eugene V. Debs IWW, labor organizer, Presidential candidate
David Dubinsky, labor leader
Max Eastman *, writer
J. Louis Engdahl
William M. Feigenbaum, New York assemblyman 1918
Elizabeth Gurley Flynn *, IWW and Communist leader
William Z. Foster *, Communist leader and presidential candidate
Louis Fraina *
Joseph Freeman *
Samuel Friedman, Vice-presidential candidate
Charles B. Garfinkel, New York assemblyman 1918, temporary chairman of the NYC central committee SPA in 1935 after Old Guard was expelled
Julius Gerber
Adolph Germer
Arturo Giovannitti
Benjamin Gitlow *
Carl Haessler *
Emanuel Haldeman-Julius SDL
Job Harriman, Vice-presidential candidate
Michael Harrington DSOC, author
Hubert Harrison
Max S. Hayes, labor leader
Bill Haywood IWW
Emil Herman
George D. Herron
Morris Hillquit ISS, labor lawyer, New York mayoral candidate
Daniel Hoan, mayor of Milwaukee
Darlington Hoopes SPUSA
Jessie Wallace Hughan ISS
Henry Jager, NY assemblyman 1921
Haim Kantorovitch
William KarlinSDF, lawyer, NY assemblyman 1918
Helen Keller
Charles H. Kerr, publisher
George R. Kirkpatrick
Antoinette Konikow *
Frederick Krafft
Maynard C. Krueger
William F. Kruse *
Leo Krzycki, chairman
Harry W. Laidler ISS
Algernon Lee ISS, SDF
Walter Lippman, journalist
Jack London ISS
Meyer London, Congressman from New York City
George R. Lunn, mayor of Schenectady, New York
Theresa S. Malkiel
Mary Marcy
James H. Maurer  SDF
Jasper McLevy SDF, mayor of Bridgeport, Connecticut
David McReynolds SPUSA, peace advocate, SPUSA presidential candidate
Herbert M. Merrill, secretary of the SPA-NY, first Socialist New York assemblyman (1912)
Walter Thomas Mills
Tom Mooney
Thomas J. Morgan
Gustavus Myers
Scott Nearing
Reinhold Niebuhr, theologian
Santeri Nuorteva
Kate Richards O'Hare
James Oneal SDF
Mary White Ovington, co-founder of the NAACP
Joseph Arthur Padway
Jacob Panken, New York municipal judge
A. Philip Randolph SDF, SDUSA, labor and civil rights leader
John Reed *, author
Victor Reuther DSOC, labor organizer
Walter Reuther, labor organizer
Elmer Rosenberg, New York assemblyman 1918
Charles Edward Russell, writer
Bayard Rustin SDUSA, civil rights organizer
Carl Sandburg, poet
Margaret Sanger, advocate of family planning
Roland D. Sawyer
Edmund Seidel, New York state senator 1921–1922
Clarence Senior
Max Shachtman
Abraham I. Shiplacoff, NY assemblyman 1916, 1917, 1918
Upton Sinclair ISS, writer, organized End Poverty in California (EPIC)
John W. Slayton
John Spargo SDL, writer
Seymour Stedman
Charles P. Steinmetz, physicist
A.M. Stirton, publisher of The Wage Slave, candidate for governor in Michigan in 1908
J.G. Phelps Stokes ISSSDL, social reformer
Rose Pastor Stokes *, social reformer
Maurice Sugar
Norman Thomas, peace advocate, Presidential candidate
Henry M. Tichenor
Hermon F. Titus
Gus Tyler, writer and labor leader
Ernest Untermann
Charles H. Vail
Baruch Charney Vladeck
Alfred Wagenknecht *
Louis Waldman SDF
Julius Wayland, publisher of The Appeal to Reason
Joseph A. Whitehorn, lawyer, New York assemblyman 1917, 1918
George W. Woodbey, preacher and African-American leader
John M. Work
Frank P. Zeidler SPUSA, mayor of Milwaukee, SPUSA presidential candidate

Main